Moinabad is one of the residential neighbourhoods of Karachi, Sindh, Pakistan. It is part of Landhi Town in Karachi city.

References

External links

Neighbourhoods of Karachi